Polymorphus actuganensis is a parasitic worm found in Eurasia. Its proboscis has 18 rows of 8 hooks.

References 

Polymorphidae
Animals described in 1949